Vladimir Pervushin (born March 25, 1986) is a Russian former professional ice hockey forward who last played for HC Sibir Novosibirsk of the Kontinental Hockey League (KHL). He had previously played with hometown club, Avangard Omsk of the KHL.

References

External links

1986 births
Living people
Admiral Vladivostok players
Amur Khabarovsk players
Avangard Omsk players
HC Sibir Novosibirsk players
HC Yugra players
Zauralie Kurgan players
Russian ice hockey forwards